Isar Aerospace is a German aerospace company based in Munich, Germany. The company was founded in 2018. The company is named after the river that flows through Munich.

Development
The company is developing Spectrum, a two-stage, liquid-fueled rocket designed to launch 1,000 kilograms to low Earth orbit.

Isar Aerospace intends to manufacture 80% of the rocket themselves, using primarily technology from the tech firms in the area surrounding Munich.

The first test flight of Spectrum is scheduled for 2023.

Funding
In April 2020 Isar Aerospace closed US$17M in Series A funding to build its space platform.

In December 2020, the company got an additional €75 million ($91 million) in funding.

In April 2021, Isar Aerospace, signed a contract with Andøya Space to lease the launch pad. The 20-year deal will allow the company to launch the Spectrum.

In July 2021, Porsche SE acquired a small stake in Isar Aerospace. The financial terms of the deal are not disclosed, but it is known that in the new round of financing, the startup raised about $75 million. Porsche explained of its investment that Isar Aerospace had great potential to become a leading European manufacturer of launch vehicles. 

In total, the startup has raised more than $180 million from investors such as HV Capital, Lakestar, Earlybird and Airbus Ventures.

In January 2022 the company won European Commission’s European Innovation Council (EIC) Horizon Prize  “Low-Cost Space Launch”, granted with 10 million euros.

In July 2022, Isar Aerospace announced that the French space agency, the CNES, selected the startup to be the first private company to be launched from the Guiana Space Centre, in French Guiana. The company will use the former launchpad of Diamant.

See also 

 Rocket Factory Augsburg
 HyImpulse

References

External links 

 Isar Aerospace - Launch Solutions for Satellite Constellations

Aerospace companies of Germany
Private spaceflight companies
German companies established in 2018
Manufacturing companies based in Munich